USS Charles Phelps was a ship acquired by the Union Navy during the American Civil War. She was used by the Navy as an auxiliary support vessel, delivering coal to Union steamers blockading Confederate ports.

Service history
Charles Phelps was built in 1848 at New London, Connecticut, as a whaler; purchased at New Bedford, Massachusetts, 24 June 1861; and commissioned later in the year, Acting Master W. F. North in command. Assigned as a coal supply ship for the North Atlantic Blockading Squadron, Charles Phelps served in Hampton Roads, Virginia, throughout the Civil War, resupplying ships enforcing the Union blockade in the area. Charles Phelps was sold at New York City 25 October 1865.

References 

Ships of the Union Navy
Ships built in New London, Connecticut
Colliers of the United States Navy
1848 ships